The Santiago microregion is a micro-region in the western part of the state of Rio Grande do Sul, Brazil. Its total area is 11,213.844 km².

Municipalities 
The microregion consists of the following municipalities:
 Capão do Cipó
 Itacurubi
 Jari
 Júlio de Castilhos
 Pinhal Grande
 Quevedos
 Santiago
 Tupanciretã
 Unistalda

References

Microregions of Rio Grande do Sul